Jesús Lomelí Rosas (born 15 January 1953) is a Mexican politician affiliated with the Institutional Revolutionary Party. As of 2014 he served as Deputy of the LIX Legislature of the Mexican Congress as a plurinominal representative.

References

1953 births
Living people
Politicians from Jalisco
Members of the Chamber of Deputies (Mexico)
Institutional Revolutionary Party politicians
University of Guadalajara alumni
Academic staff of the University of Guadalajara
21st-century Mexican politicians
Deputies of the LIX Legislature of Mexico